Ten from Tomorrow is a collection of science fiction short stories (see Index to Science Fiction Anthologies and Collections) by E. C. Tubb, published in 1966. It includes:

 "The Ming Vase"
 "Tell the Truth"
 "The Last Day of Summer"
 "Fresh Guy"
 "Vigil"
 "Piebald Horse"
 "Sense of Proportion"
 "Greater Than Infinity"
 "Last of the Morticians"
 "Worm in the Woodwork"

References
 

1966 short story collections
Science fiction short story collections
British short story collections